The 2020 Brazilian Jiu-Jitsu European Championship, officially called the 2020 European Jiu-Jitsu IBJFF Championship,  was an international jiu-jitsu event organised by the International Brazilian Jiu-Jitsu Federation (IBJFF) held between 20 and 26 January 2020 in Lisbon, Portugal.

Men's medallists 
Adult male black belt results

Women's medallists 
Adult female black belt results

Teams results 
Results by Academy

See also 
European IBJJF Jiu-Jitsu Championship
World IBJJF Jiu-Jitsu Championship
Pan IBJJF Jiu-Jitsu Championship
Asian IBJJF Jiu-Jitsu Championship

Notes

References 

Brazilian jiu-jitsu competitions
Brazilian jiu-jitsu European Championship
Brazilian jiu-jitsu European Championship
Brazilian Jiu-Jitsu in Portugal
International sports competitions hosted by Portugal
Sports competitions in Lisbon
European Championship
Brazilian jiu-jitsu competitions in Portugal
European Jiu-Jitsu Championship